Mohammed Asghar (born 29 August 1980) is a cricketer who plays for the Kuwait national cricket team. He made his Twenty20 International (T20I) debut for Kuwait against the Maldives on 20 January 2019 in the 2019 ACC Western Region T20 tournament.

References

External links
 

1980 births
Living people
Kuwaiti cricketers
Kuwait Twenty20 International cricketers
Pakistani expatriates in Kuwait